Demophilus (Δημόφιλος; died 386) was a bishop of Berea and an archbishop of Constantinople from 370 until he was expelled in 380.

Biography
Born of good family in Thessalonica, he was  elected by the Arians to the bishopric of Constantinople. The opinion of the populace, however, were much divided. The orthodox party chose Evagrius for their bishop, and he was ordained by Eustathius, the deposed bishop of Antioch. This was the signal for a furious outburst from the Arians. Both Eustathius and Evagrius were banished by the emperor Valens, and their followers bitterly persecuted.

Soon after his accession, Demophilus went to Cyzicus with Dorotheus, or Theodorus, of Heraclea to procure the election of an Arian bishop, which was left vacant since the banishment of Eunomius. Nevertheless, the people of Cyzicus refused to acknowledge them until they had anathematized Aetius, Eunomius, and their followers. They were then permitted to ordain a bishop chosen by the people. The bishop who was ordained straightway and clearly taught the consubstantial faith.

In 380 emperor Theodosius I made the patriarchate of Demophilus memorable. Theodosius offered to confirm him in his see, if he would accept the Nicene Creed. Demophilus refused, and was immediately ordered to give up his churches. He then called his followers together and retired, with Lucius of Alexandria and others, to a church outside of the city walls. The churches of Constantinople, which had for forty years been in Arian hands, were now restored to the orthodox; and similarly in other cities. It was in fact a re-establishment of Catholicism.

Philostorgius adds that Demophilus went to his own city, Berea; however this must have been some time afterwards, or he must have returned from exile, for he represented the Arian party at the synod in Constantinople in 383. The same writer says that Demophilus was wont to throw everything into confusion, especially the doctrines of the Church, and quotes from a sermon at Constantinople, in which he spoke of the human nature of the Saviour as lost in the divine, as a glass of milk when poured into the sea.

References

Attribution

 Onslow used the following sources:
Philostorgius. H. E. ix. 10, 13, 14, 19;
Philostorgius Patrol. Gk. lxv.;
Socrates Scholasticus H. E. iv. 14, v. 7, 10;
Sozomenus H. E. vi. 13, 14; vii. 12;
 Soz. and Socr. Patrol. Gk. lxvii.

|-

386 deaths
Arian bishops
4th-century Archbishops of Constantinople
Roman-era Thessalonians
Christianity in Roman Macedonia
4th-century Romans
Year of birth unknown
Arian Archbishops of Constantinople